Wicklow (meaning 'church of the toothless one')  is the county town of County Wicklow in Ireland. It is located on the east just south of Dublin. According to the 2016 census, it has a population of 10,584. The town is to the east of the M11 route between Dublin and Wexford. It also has railway links to Dublin, Wexford, Arklow, and Rosslare Europort. There is also a commercial port for timber and textile imports. The River Vartry is the main river flowing through the town.

Geography

Wicklow town forms a rough semicircle around Wicklow harbour. To the immediate north lies 'The Murrough', a grassy walking area beside the sea, and the eastern coastal strip. The Murrough is a place of growing commercial use, so much so that a road by-passing the town directly to the commercial part of the area commenced construction in 2008 and was completed in summer of 2010. The eastern coastal strip includes Wicklow bay, a crescent shaped stone beach approximately 10 km in length.

Ballyguile Hill is to the southwest of the town. Much of the housing developments of the 1970s and 1980s occurred in this area, despite the considerable gradient from the town centre. From Wicklow the land rises into rolling hills to the west, going on to meet the Wicklow Mountains in the centre of the county. The dominant feature to the south is the rocky headlands of Bride's Head and Wicklow Head, the easternmost mainland point of the Republic of Ireland. On a very clear day, it is possible to see the Snowdonia mountain range in Wales.

Climate
Similar to much of the rest of northwestern Europe, Wicklow experiences a maritime climate (Cfb) with cool summers, mild winters, and a lack of temperature extremes. The average maximum January temperature is 9.2 °C (48.6 °F), while the average maximum July temperature is 20.4 °C (68.7 °F). On average, the sunniest month is May. The wettest month is October with 118.9 mm (4.6 in) of rain, and the driest month is April with 60.7 mm (2.4 in). With the exceptions of October and November, rainfall is evenly distributed throughout the year with rainfall falling within a relatively narrow band of between 60 mm (2.4 in) and 86 mm (3.4 in) for any one month. A considerable spike of moisture occurs in October and November, each of which records almost double the typical rainfall of April.

Wicklow is sheltered from moisture locally by Ballyguile hill and, more distantly by the Wicklow mountains. This causes the town to receive only about 60% of the rainfall the west coast receives. In addition, because Wicklow is protected by the mountains from southwesterly and westerly winds, it enjoys higher average temperatures than much of Ireland. While its location is favourable for protection against the prevailing westerly and southwesterly winds that are common to much of Ireland, Wicklow is particularly exposed to easterly winds. As these winds come from the northern European landmass Wicklow can, along with much of the east coast of Ireland, experience relatively sharp temperature drops in winter for short periods.

Economy
Since 1995, the town has undergone significant change and expansion reflecting the simultaneous growth in the Irish economy. Residential developments have taken place to the west of the town along Marlton Road (R751). More recently, housing developments have been concentrated to the northwest of the town towards the neighbouring village of Rathnew. The completion of the Ashford/Rathnew bypass in 2004 meant that Wicklow is now linked to Dublin (42 km north) by dual carriageway and motorway. These factors have led to a steady growth in population of Wicklow and its surrounding townlands while its importance as a commuter town to Dublin increases.

Toponymy
Earlier spellings of the town's name include Wykinglo in the late 12th century, and Wykinglowe in the 14th century.

The name is usually explained as coming from the Old Norse words Víkingr ("Viking") and ló ("meadow"), that is to say "the Vikings' meadow". Swedish toponymist Magne Oftedal criticizes this, saying that -ló was never used outside Scandinavia nor in such a combination. He argues that the first element is Uikar- or Uik- ("bay"), and that the intermediate -n- of the old forms is a mistake by clerks. However, all early recorded forms show this -n-. For this reason, Liam Price and A. Sommerfelt derive it from Víkinga-ló ("the Vikings' meadow"). 

Nevertheless, the Irish patronymics Ó hUiginn and Mac Uiginn (anglicised O'Higgins and Maguigan) could bring a key for the meaning "Meadow of a man called Viking".

The origin of the Irish name Cill Mhantáin bears no relation to the name Wicklow. It has an interesting folklore of its own. Saint Patrick and some followers are said to have tried to land on Travailahawk beach, which is to the south of the harbour. Hostile locals attacked them, causing one of Patrick's party to lose his front teeth. Manntach ("toothless one"), as he became known, was undeterred; he returned to the town and eventually founded a church, hence Cill Mhantáin ("church of the toothless one"). Although its anglicised spelling Kilmantan was used for a time and featured in some placenames in the town like Kilmantan Hill, it has gradually fell out of use. The Anglo-Normans who conquered this part of Ireland preferred the non-Irish placename.

History
During excavations to build the Wicklow road bypass in 2010, a Bronze Age cooking pit (known in Irish as a fulach fiadh) and hut site was uncovered in the Ballynerrn Lower area of the town. A radio carbon-dating exercise on the site puts the timeline of the discovery at 900 BC.
It has been argued that an identifiable Celtic culture had emerged in Ireland by 600 BC or even earlier. According to the Greek cartographer and historian, Ptolemy, the area around Wicklow was settled by a Celtic tribe called the Cauci/Canci. This tribe is believed to have originated in the region containing today's Belgium/German border. The area around Wicklow was referred to as Menapia in Ptolemy's map which itself dates back to 130 AD.

Vikings landed in Ireland around 795 AD and began plundering monasteries and settlements for riches and to capture slaves. In the mid-9th century, Vikings established a base which took advantage of the natural harbour at Wicklow. It is from this chapter of Wicklow's history that the name 'Wicklow' originates.

 
The Norman influence can still be seen today in some of the town's place and family names. After the Norman invasion, Wicklow was granted to Maurice FitzGerald who set about building the 'Black Castle', a land-facing fortification that lies ruined on the coast immediately south of the harbour. The castle was briefly held by the local O'Byrne, the O'Toole and Kavanagh clans in the uprising of 1641 but was quickly abandoned when English troops approached the town. Sir Charles Coote, who led the troops is then recorded as engaging in "savage and indiscriminate" slaughter of the townspeople in an act of revenge. Local oral history contends that one of these acts of "wanton cruelty" was the entrapment and deliberate burning to death of an unknown number of people in a building in the town. Though no written account of this particular detail of Coote's attack on Wicklow is available, a small laneway, locally referred to as "Melancholy Lane", is said to have been where this event took place.

Though the surrounding county of Wicklow is rich in Bronze Age monuments, the oldest surviving settlement in Wicklow proper is the ruined Franciscan friary. This is located at the west end of Main Street, within the gardens of the local Catholic parish grounds. Other notable buildings include the Town Hall and Wicklow Gaol, which was built in 1702 and later renovated as a heritage centre and tourist attraction. The East Breakwater, arguably the most important building in the town, was built in the early 1880s by Wicklow Harbour Commissioners. The architect was William George Strype and the builder was John Jackson. The north Groyne was completed by about 1909; John Pansing was the designer and Louis Nott of Bristol the builder. Wicklow Gaol was a place of execution up to the end of the 19th century and it was here that Billy Byrne, a leader of the 1798 rebellion, met his end in 1799. He is commemorated by a statue in the town square. At Fitzwilliam Square in the centre of Wicklow town is an obelisk commemorating the career of Captain Robert Halpin, commander of the telegraph cable ship Great Eastern, who was born in Wicklow in 1836.

According to the 2016 census, Wicklow has a population of 10,584.

Transport
Bus Éireann, I.P Passenger Services Ltd (trading as Wexford Bus) and Irish Rail all operate to and through the town. Bus Éireann provides an hourly which is half-hourly at peak-time service to Dublin City Centre and Airport. Also a service is operated twice daily to Arklow via Rathdrum. Wexford Bus operates 9 services to Dublin and 10 from Dublin each day. Wexford Bus' services are one hour each way, some 30 mins shorter than the Bus Eireann service. However they do not go through the town, dropping passengers at the Grand Hotel before continuing on to Arklow.

Route 133 Wicklow (Monument) to Busaras via Rathnew, Ashford, and a number of other points through Donnybrook and onwards to Dublin City Centre.
 Route 740A (Wexford Bus) Wicklow Town to Dublin Airport via Kilmacanogue, UCD, Leeson Street, and other stops through to Swords Road and Dublin Airport
Route 133L Wicklow (Monument) to Arklow via Rathnew, Rathdrum, Avoca, Woodenbridge and other points en route to Arklow.
Route 133X Wicklow (Monument) to Dublin Airport via Rathnew, Ashford and a number of other points through Donnybrook and Dublin City Centre onwards to Dublin Airport.

A train service operates northbound to Dublin Connolly via Kilcoole, Greystones, Bray, Dun Laoghaire, Pearse Street and Tara Street en route to Connolly 6 times on Monday to Fridays. Other trains operate southbound to Rosslare Europort via Rathdrum, Arklow, Gorey, Enniscorthy, Wexford and Rosslare Strand.

Sports and recreation
Wicklow Golf Club, founded in 1904, is located between the town and Wicklow head, while Blainroe Golf Club is situated about 3.5 km south of Wicklow. Oak Hill Cricket Club is located 7.5 km south of Wicklow. The club plays its home matches at Oak Hill Cricket Club Ground, which was constructed in 2008. The ground has hosted first-class cricket matches for Ireland and Leinster Lightning.

News media
The Wicklow News was set up on 15 August 2016. Their current partial address is in Wicklow.

Twinning 

Wicklow is twinned with the following places:
 Eichenzell, Hesse, Germany
 Montigny-le-Bretonneux, Île-de-France, France
 Porthmadog, Gwynedd, Wales

Notable people

 Leo Cullen, Irish rugby union coach
 Josh van der Flier, Irish rugby union player
 Nicholas Ford, Irish-born American politician
 William Goodison, surgeon
 Robert Halpin, captain of the SS Great Eastern
 F. E. Higgins, children's author
 Hybrasil, electronica group
 Jimmy Martin, golfer
 Fionnuala McCormack, Olympic distance runner
 Paul McShane, footballer
 Ursula Stephens, Irish-born Australian politician
 John Ussher, priest
 George Drought Warburton, soldier and politician

Gallery

See also
List of towns and villages in Ireland

References

Bibliography
 Cleary, J and O'Brien, A (2001) Wicklow Harbour: A History, Wicklow Harbour Commissioners

External links

Wicklow Tourism page on Wicklow Town
Wicklow Chamber of Commerce
History of Wicklow Town in MP3 format
Wicklow Mountains National Park
Dublin & Wicklow Walks

 
County towns in the Republic of Ireland
Port cities and towns in the Republic of Ireland
Towns and villages in County Wicklow
Viking Age populated places